Terence or Terry Kelly may refer to:
 Terence Kelly (actor), Canadian actor
 Khalid Kelly (Terence Kelly, 1967–2016), former leader of Al-Mujaharoun in Ireland
Terry Kelly (chess player) (1930–2010), Irish chess master
Terry Kelly (singer) (born 1955), Canadian country singer
Terry Kelly (Irish footballer), Irish football player
Terry Kelly (hurler) (1934–2019), Irish hurler
Terry Kelly (English footballer) (1932–2007), English football player
 Terence Darrell Kelly, who was charged with offences relating to the disappearance of Cleo Smith